Leonard Louis Hill (22 November 1886 – 21 July 1963) was an Australian politician and member of the Country Party.

He was the Member for the Electoral district of Albany, in Western Australia, from 1936 to 1956.

References
Black, David; Prescott, Valerie (1997). Election statistics, Legislative Assembly of Western Australia, 1890–1996. Perth: Parliamentary History Project. .
Hughes, Colin A.; Graham, B. D. (1976). Voting for the South Australian, Western Australian and Tasmanian Lower Houses, 1890–1964. Canberra: Australian National University. .

1886 births
1963 deaths
Members of the Western Australian Legislative Assembly

20th-century Australian politicians
People from Albury, New South Wales